150 Regiment RLC is a regiment of the Royal Logistic Corps Army Reserve in the United Kingdom

History
The regiment was formed in the Royal Corps of Transport in 1967, as 150th (Northumbrian) Transport Regiment from seven territorial transport regiments, with four transport squadrons. The regiment was transferred into the Royal Logistic Corps and was renamed the 150th (Yorkshire) Regiment RLC in 1993. 216 Squadron was transferred to 159th Support Regiment in 2006 but transferred back under Army 2020 in 2014.

Structure
The regiment's structure is:
Regimental Headquarters, at Londesborough Barracks, Hull
523 Headquarters Squadron, at Londesborough Barracks, Hull
216 Transport Squadron, in Tynemouth
217 Transport Squadron, in Leeds
218 Transport Squadron, in Hull
219 Transport Squadron, in Doncaster

References

External links
 

Regiments of the Royal Corps of Transport
Regiments of the Royal Logistic Corps
Military units and formations established in 1967